The Buena Vista Rancheria of Me-Wuk Indians of California is a federally recognized tribe of Miwok in Amador County, California. The Buena Vista Miwok are Sierra Miwok, an indigenous people of California.

Government
The tribe conducts business from Sacramento, California. The tribe is led by an elected council. The current tribal chairperson is Rhonda Morningstar Pope.

Tribal staff includes Michael D. DeSpain, Chief Operation Officer, and Arnold Samuel, the General Counsel. Tribal enrollment is based in lineal descent from original tribal members; that is, the tribe has no minimum blood quantum requirements.

The federal acknowledgment of "Buena Vista Rancheria of Me-Wuk Indians," is being challenged by a lawsuit that is currently awaiting scheduling in the Ninth Circuit Court of appeals in San Francisco in "Friends of Amador County, et al. versus Ken Salazar, et al."

http://www.ledger.news/news/local_news/amador-county-faces-setbacks-in-casino-lawsuits/article_a34f337c-d9ea-11e7-b09e-170965d1e1e7.html
https://www.indianz.com/IndianGaming/2016/03/17/judge-backs-bia-in-longrunning.asp

Reservation
The Buena Vista Rancheria is  parcel of land, located just outside the census-designated place of Buena Vista. The land once belonged to the Oliver family and was purchased by the federal government to establish an Indian rancheria in 1927.

Casino
Harrah's Northern California is a tribal casino owned by the tribe and located on its reservation. Caesars Entertainment manages the casino and licenses the Harrah's name to the tribe. The casino has  of gaming space with 20 table games and about 1,000 slot machines.

The tribe won its legal fight against Amador County to allow the development of the casino in 2016. In 2018, the tribe sold $205 million of high-interest junk bonds to finance the project, and struck its development agreement with Caesars. The casino opened on 29 April 2019.

History
The rancheria was unilaterally terminated by Congress, along with 42 other rancherias, under the California Rancheria Act of 1958. The tribe has been federally recognized since 1985. In 1970, President Richard Nixon declared the Rancheria Act a failure. The Buena Vista Rancheria tribe joined 16 other native California tribes in a class action lawsuit, Hardwick v. United States to restore their sovereignty, and in 1987, the tribes won their lawsuit. On 22 December 1983 the Buena Vista Rancheria tribe ratified its constitution.

See also
Plains and Sierra Miwok

Notes

References
 Pritzker, Barry M. A Native American Encyclopedia: History, Culture, and Peoples. Oxford: Oxford University Press, 2000.

External links
 Official Buena Vista Rancheria of Me-Wuk Indians website

Miwok
Native American tribes in California
Federally recognized tribes in the United States
Populated places in Amador County, California
American Indian reservations in California
Amador County, California